USS Lady Betty (SP-661) was a United States Navy patrol vessel in commission from 1917 to 1918.

Lady Betty was built as the private motorboat Chatana by the Matthews Boat Company at Port Clinton, Ohio, in 1913. She was later renamed Lady Betty.

On 28 May 1917, the U.S. Navy chartered Lady Betty from her owner, Frank S. Washburn, Jr., of Rye, New York, for use as a section patrol boat during World War I. The Navy took delivery of Lady Betty on 11 June 1917 at Newport, Rhode Island, and she was commissioned as USS Lady Betty (SP-661) on 25 June 1917.

Assigned to the 2nd Naval District in southern New England, Lady Betty carried out patrol duties in Newport Harbor and along the coast of Narragansett Bay for the rest of World War I.

Lady Betty was decommissioned on 25 November 1918 and returned to Washburn on 9 December 1918. It is unclear whether she bore the name Lady Betty or Chatana after her return to him.

Notes

References

SP-661 Lady Betty at Department of the Navy Naval History and Heritage Command Online Library of Selected Images: U.S. Navy Ships -- Listed by Hull Number: "SP" #s and "ID" #s -- World War I Era Patrol Vessels and other Acquired Ships and Craft numbered from SP-600 through SP-699
NavSource Online: Section Patrol Craft Photo Archive Lady Betty (SP 661)

Patrol vessels of the United States Navy
World War I patrol vessels of the United States
Ships built in Port Clinton, Ohio
1913 ships